Arsenal Women Football Club, commonly referred to as Arsenal unless distinguishing themselves from the men's team, is an English professional women's football club based in Islington, London, England. The club plays in the Women's Super League, the top tier of English women's football.

Arsenal were founded in 1987 following an initiative by Vic Akers, who became the club's first, longest-serving, and most successful manager. He guided Arsenal to continued success until his departure in 2009, winning the most top-flight matches in English football history. The club have sustained this record, and have won the most doubles and trebles in English football history. Arsenal have also completed a record seven unbeaten league seasons, setting a number of English records for longest top-flight unbeaten run, for goals scored, and points won.

Arsenal are statistically the most successful club in English women's football, holding the records for most titles won in each domestic competition they have played in. The club have won 15 league titles, 14 Women's FA Cups, 6 Women's League Cups, 10 Women's National League Cups, 5 Women's FA Community Shields, and are the only English club to win the UEFA Women's Champions League. They are also the only English club to win the continental treble while going undefeated in all competitions played that same season. In the 2006–07 season, the club became the first in the history of women's football to achieve the continental European sextuple.

Arsenal play their home games at Meadow Park in Borehamwood, and occasionally at the Emirates Stadium.

History

1987–2009: Founding and early success

In 1987, long-term Arsenal men's team kit manager Vic Akers helped found a women's football club, and was appointed as their initial manager. The club began operating as Arsenal Ladies Football Club. Due to the status of women's football in England suffering from an overall decline in interest, Arsenal were limited to sparse, nomadic cup appearances for the first four years of their existence, and did not turn semi-professional until 2002. They won their first major honour, the Women's League Cup, in the 1991–92 season. Also in 1992, they won promotion to the FA Women's Premier League from the FA Women's National League South, and a season later, won the top division title at the first time of asking.

This began a period of sustained dominance for the club, who soon permanently moved into Meadow Park in Borehamwood, Hertfordshire, in a groundshare agreement with non-league side Boreham Wood. Following the storied successes of the men's team, Arsenal made a conscious effort to brand women's football as equitable. Over the next twenty years, Arsenal approached all facets of the game, such as training, tactics, scouting, and finance, with the goal to maximize the growth of the club and attain trophies. Throughout the 1990s and 2000s, Arsenal lavished atop the Premier League for many seasons, boasting academy graduates like Marieanne Spacey and Faye White, as well as utilizing the club's income on stars like Emma Byrne, to allow the club to win a slew of trophies.

Under Akers' stewardship, Arsenal enjoyed unilateral domestic success, as the club claimed 11 league titles, nine FA Women's Cup titles, ten FA Women's Premier League Cup titles, and five FA Women's Community Shield wins. This included seven straight league wins from the 2003–04 season to 2008–09 season, as well as six unbeaten campaigns. Moreover, Akers lead the team to the most successful club season in English women's football in the 2006–07 season, as the team won every single competition available to them, including the ever elusive UEFA Women's Cup. The win marked Arsenal's only trophy won from European competition, and the first time an English club won the competition. This unique sextuple was recognized with The Committee Award by the Sports Journalists' Association in the 2007 Sports Journalists' Awards.

Akers also led the team to a number of English women's football records, including a six-year league unbeaten run from October 2003 to March 2009, marking 108 games without defeat. During that spell, Arsenal won a record 51 league games in a row, between November 2005 and April 2008. Akers retired from management following a domestic treble in the 2008–09 season.

2009–present: Post-Akers and the WSL

Akers was succeeded by Tony Gervaise, who resigned in February 2010 after only eight months in charge, suggesting his position had been undermined by outside interference. In an unusual development, reserve coach Laura Harvey became first-team manager and Gervaise became reserve coach. This appointment marked the club's first female coach in any capacity.

After a year break in play in preparation for a reformatted league, Arsenal were named as founder members of the FA Women's Super League, which commenced in the spring of 2011. Arsenal won the inaugural season, marking their eighth consecutive English title, and secured another domestic double by also winning the FA Cup. After a two-year period without a league triumph, Shelley Kerr was announced as Harvey's successor in 2013. Under her management, the club won two FA Women's Cups, including a win in 2014 two weeks after the men's team won the 2014 FA Cup, completing a rare FA Cup double for the club. But after a poor run of form which saw Arsenal gain only one point from the opening four league matches of the 2014 season, including exits from the Champions League to minnows Birmingham and a shock lose to Reading, Kerr resigned. She was replaced by Pedro Losa. Losa led the team to the 2015 FA WSL Cup and the 2016 FA Women's Cup. Moreover, he helped to rebuild the squad, notably recruiting younger stars like Daniëlle van de Donk, Kim Little, Beth Mead and Vivianne Miedema. Losa also brought through youngsters like Leah Williamson. However, Losa resigned following the season's end and was replaced by Joe Montemurro.

In July 2017, the club rebranded as Arsenal Women Football Club, in a move described by Arsenal as "clear signal of togetherness and unity", and to retain the progressive ethos of the club. Utilizing the core Losa helped build, Montemurro led Arsenal to the 2018–19 Women's Super League title with a game to spare. The win marked their first title in seven years, and marked the club's return to the Champions League for the first time in five years. Montemurro left the club at the end of the 2020–21 season.

Following the resignation of Montemurro, the club appointed Jonas Eidevall as head coach of Arsenal. On 24 September 2022, the North London derby at the Emirates Stadium recorded an attendance figure of 47,367, the highest ever for a WSL match. Arsenal won the match 4-0. On 5 March 2023, Arsenal defeated Chelsea 3-1 in the Women's League Cup final to win their first trophy since 2019.

Kits

Kit suppliers and shirt sponsors

Stadium
Arsenal Women play most of their home matches at Meadow Park, home of  National League side Boreham Wood, in Borehamwood, Hertfordshire. It has a capacity of 4,500, although attendances for most league matches are around 1,000. Arsenal's home UEFA Women's Champions League matches are also played here. However, due to the connection with Arsenal F.C., they are permitted to play in the Emirates Stadium on occasions.

Players

First-team squad

Out on loan

Academy

Arsenal also operate a reserve team, which is mainly formed from Academy players. The reserves have won four FA Women's Premier Reserve League titles and five FA Women's Premier Reserve League Cups in their history.

Former players
For notable current and former players, see :Category:Arsenal W.F.C. players.

Management and staff

Current staff

As of 25 February 2023

Managerial history

Hall of Fame
The following Arsenal players have been inducted into the Women's Super League Hall of Fame.

Notes:
 Players who have spent the majority or the entirety of their career at Arsenal are listed in bold.

Honours
Seasons in bold are seasons when the club won a double of the league and FA Cup.

Domestic

League
FA Women's Premier League National Division / FA Women's Super League (Level 1)
Winners (15) (record): 1992–93, 1994–95, 1996–97, 2000–01, 2001–02, 2003–04, 2004–05, 2005–06, 2006–07, 2007–08, 2008–09, 2009–10, 2011, 2012, 2018–19

FA Women's Premier League Southern Division (Level 2)
Winners (1): 1991–92

Cups
FA Women's Cup
Winners (14) (record): 1992–93, 1994–95, 1997–98, 1998–99, 2000–01, 2003–04, 2005–06, 2006–07, 2007–08, 2008–09, 2010–11, 2012–13, 2013–14, 2015–16

FA WSL Cup / FA Women's League Cup
Winners (6) (record): 2011, 2012, 2013, 2015, 2017–18, 2022–23

FA Women's Premier League Cup
Winners (10) (record): 1991–92, 1992–93, 1993–94, 1997–98, 1998–99, 1999–00, 2000–01, 2004–05, 2006–07, 2008–09

FA Women's Community Shield
Winners (5) (record): 2000 (shared), 2001, 2005, 2006, 2008

European
UEFA Women's Champions League
Winners (1): 2006–07

County 
London County FA Women's Cup
Winners (10) (record): 1994–95, 1995–96, 1996–97, 1999–00, 2003–04, 2006–07, 2007–08, 2008–09, 2009–10, 2010–11

UEFA club coefficient ranking
In European football, the UEFA coefficients are statistics used for ranking and seeding teams in club and international competitions. Club coefficients are used to rank individual clubs for seeding in the UEFA Women's Champions League.

See also
 List of women's association football clubs in England and Wales
 Women's football in England
 List of women's association football clubs

References

Sources

External links

 Official website
 Profile on UEFA.com

 
Women's football clubs in England
Women's football clubs in London
Football clubs in Hertfordshire
Association football clubs established in 1987
1987 establishments in England
FA WSL 1 teams
Kroenke Sports & Entertainment